Stephen Andrew Soderstrom (born April 3, 1972) is a former Major League Baseball player. He attended Turlock High School. Soderstrom went on to pitch for Fresno State University.

The draft 
He was drafted by the New York Mets in the 15th Round (402nd overall) of the 1990 amateur draft. He didn't sign. Then, in 1993, he was drafted by the San Francisco Giants sixth overall in the 1993 amateur entry draft.

After the draft 
He spent three years in the Giants' organization before getting to the major leagues. The 6'3", 215 pound right-hander made his major league debut on September 17, 1996. His stay in the majors lasted just 10 days, as his final MLB game was on September 27. Over those ten days, he started all three of the games he pitched in, compiling a 2-0 record while giving up 16 hits in 13 innings and gaining an ERA of 5.27. He walked six and struck out nine.

He currently owns and operates Backyard Sports Academy, a multi-sport instructional facility, in his hometown of Turlock.

His son, Tyler, was drafted number 26 overall in the 2020 Major League Baseball Draft by the Oakland Athletics. He is a catcher and attended the same high school as his father. They became the 10th father-son duo to be drafted in the first round. Another son, Tate, is an outfielder at the University of Arizona.

References

External links 

Articles and Books About Steve Soderstrom
Baseball Almanac Steve Soderstrom Page
Another Steve Soderstrom Page
Back Yard Sports Academy - Owner Steve Soderstrom

1972 births
Baseball players from California
Major League Baseball pitchers
Living people
San Francisco Giants players
Fresno State Bulldogs baseball players
People from Turlock, California